Biligundlu, also known as Thiruvillikuntru, is a small village in the Bank of Kaveri. There is a water measuring station, set up by the Central Water Commission at Biligundlu (inter-State border) in Krishnagiri district of Tamil Nadu.

References

External links
 https://web.archive.org/web/20180202192355/http://www.cwc.nic.in/

Villages in Krishnagiri district